Bogdan Sorin Stancu (born 28 June 1987) is a Romanian professional footballer who plays as a forward.

Stancu started his professional career at Argeș Pitești, and had a brief loan spell at Mioveni. Due to an irregularity in his contract he left the club and joined Unirea Urziceni. In the summer of 2008, after two years at Urziceni, he moved to Steaua București and finished his first season as Steaua's top scorer with 11 goals. In the first half of the 2010–11 season Stancu scored 16 times in 27 games after which Galatasaray paid €5m to secure his services. After a not so successful stint at the Turkish club, he joined Orduspor. After they were relegated from the Süper Lig, Stancu moved to Gençlerbirliği for an undisclosed fee.

At international level, his career started in 2010 and he played for Euro 2016.

Club career

FC Argeș
Stancu was discovered at a trial by coach Mihai Ianovschi in 1998, who took him to the junior team of Argeș Pitești.

In 2001, at the age of 14, Stancu was at the youth academy of FC Argeș when his father died due to heart failure. He was deeply affected by the loss and quit football for a few months.

In 2005, he was brought to the first team by Sorin Cârțu. After a short period he was sent to Dacia Mioveni in Divizia B, where he had a contract of only $1000 per month and a clause by which he earned $1 for every minute played for Mioveni. His team won a few games with Stancu as their only goalscorer. After a season where he scored 3 goals in 12 matches, he returned to FC Argeș and made his debut in Divizia A at the age of 19 against former champions Steaua București, game which ended as a goalless draw.

In the summer of 2006, Sorin Cârțu resigned from the club and former Italian star Giuseppe Giannini was appointed as the new manager of Argeș Pitești. After two weeks of training he decided that Bogdan Stancu and another player, Robert Neagoe, should be released. He ended up making only 7 appearances for his team that season. Stancu was sent once again to Dacia Mioveni during the pre-season but after a few days, Gigi Nețoiu brought him to Unirea Urziceni. In May 2008, after three years at Unirea, Stancu was transferred to Steaua București. Local media reported the fee to be in the region of €1 million.

Steaua Bucharest

2008–09 season
On 30 June 2008, Stancu played his first match in Steaua's shirt in a friendly against Maribor, scoring the first goal. He scored his second goal On 26 July against Roma in a friendly game, Steaua won 3–1.

On 23 August 2008, Stancu scored his first double for Steaua against Gloria Bistrița in Liga I. In his first five Liga I matches for Steaua he scored four goals. He managed to score four goals in several winter break friendly matches. After the winter break he scored again in the first match against Vaslui. On 14 March 2009, he scored in the sixth minute of the match against Politehnica Iași, leading Steaua to its victory. At his first season at Steaua was top scorer with 11 goals, along with Greek Pantelis Kapetanos.

2009–10 season
Stancu started the new season scoring the second goal for his team against Újpest in the second qualifying round of Europa League, on 16 July 2009, making the score 2–0 for Steaua București. He scored the third and final goal against Motherwell after being served perfectly by Rafał Grzelak. On 6 August 2009, he scored two more goals against the same Motherwell and help his team qualify in the Europa League playoffs. After his great performances in Europa League he was rewarded by Răzvan Lucescu with a call-up in the Romania national team against Hungary. However, during a league match he got injured and Lucescu dropped him from the team.
Two weeks later he scored another two goals against St Patrick's Athletic. In 9 European matches he scored 6 goals. He was sent off on round 4 against Oțelul Galați in the 75th minute after receiving a second yellow card. At end of season he was top scorer of team in Europa League with 6 goals.

2010–11 season
On 25 July 2010, Stancu netted the second goal in his first start of the season in a 1–2 away win against Universitatea Cluj. In the second round he scored the equalizer in the 66th minute against FC U Craiova, after Valentin Iliev opened the score, 12 minutes later his teammate Romeo Surdu, scored the second goal helping the team to a 2–1 home win. In the 4th round he scored twice against Victoria, first goal in 24th minute and the victory goal in the 67th minute, Steaua winning home with 2–1. In his first European match of the season he scored the only goal in a 1–0 match against Grasshoppers. In the 5th round he scored against FC Vaslui, he scored second goal of the match in 46th minute, Steaua winning with 3–0. On round 10 scored two goals against Sportul Studențesc in a 4–2 victory. On next two rounds scored three goals, one against Dinamo București and two against Pandurii Târgu Jiu in a 2–0 victory. In matchday 4 at Europa League, Stancu scored two goals against Utrecht in a 3–1 victory, both goals came in the 52nd and 53rd minute. On round 17, Stancu scored twice against CFR Cluj. The next match day Stancu scored again in a 3–0 win against Universitatea Cluj.

Galatasaray
On 21 January 2011, Bogdan Stancu was sold to Turkish club Galatasaray for €5 million. He signed a four and a half year contract worth €5,2 million

He scored on his first Turkish Cup match for Galatasaray, a 2–3 loss against Gaziantepspor in the first leg of the 2010–11 Turkish Cup quarterfinals which he had scored the second goal with a long shot. Stancu then scored in his second regular match in the Turkish League too, in the 4–2 win against Eskişehirspor. On the ninth of May Stancu scored a goal in Galatasaray's victory against Kasımpaşa. He finished the season with 3 goals in 16 appearances.

Orduspor
On 23 August 2011, Stancu was loaned to Orduspor on a one-year loan deal worth €350,000. Fatih Terim decided to start the 2011–12 season with the newly arrived striker Johan Elmander and Milan Baroš.

He scored 4 goals in his first 7 games for Orduspor. In the last week of January 2012 he was chosen player of the week in the Süper Lig by Gazete Futbol due to his performance against Eskişehirspor. On 1 February he opened the score in a match against Ankaragücü. He continued his goalscoring form by scoring in the 3–2 victory against Antalyaspor on 12 February. On 11 March Stancu scored a goal in a game against Beşiktaş to eventually earn a draw for Orduspor. Then he assisted Javito's goal, in a game against Sivasspor, which finished in a 1–1 draw.

At the end of the year Stancu joined Orduspor for a fee of €2.5 million. He later signed a four-year contract worth €1.2 million per year.

Gençlerbirliği
On 25 July 2013, after Orduspor was relegated from the Süper Lig Stancu moved to Gençlerbirliği for an undisclosed fee. He made an immediate impact at Gençlerbirliği, scoring 7 league goals in his first half season, the last of which was against his former club Galatasaray.

Bursaspor
On 19 January 2017, it was reported that he signed a two-and-a-half-year deal with Bursaspor.

Return to Gençlerbirliği
On 21 January 2019, he returned to former club he signed one-and-a-half-year deal he wore number 17 on his return and in 2019–20 season he switched to number 9 shirt.

Eyüpspor
On June 18, 2021, Stancu signed a 1+1 year contract with Eyüpspor.

International career
Stancu is an ex Romania U-21 player, gathering 15 appearances and scoring 5 goals from 2006 to 2009.

On 3 September 2010, he made his debut for the Romania national team in a game against Albania coming on in the 64th minute to replace Daniel Niculae. He also scored his first goal for his national side 16 minutes into his first game. On 29 February 2012, Stancu scored from a header against Uruguay to earn Romania a draw. Stancu's first tournament goal came in the opening game of UEFA Euro 2016 against the hosts France. He netted a penalty to equalise at 1–1, although France did go on to eventually win 2–1 with Dimitri Payet scoring a winning goal in the 89th minute. He also successfully converted another penalty in the second group game against Switzerland, with the match finishing 1–1.

On 21 February 2018, Stancu officially announced his retirement from the national team at 30 years of age after the unsuccessful qualifying campaign.

Career statistics

Club
.

International

International goals

Scores and results list Romania's goal tally first.

References

External links
  
 
 
 
 
 
 
 

1987 births
Living people
Sportspeople from Pitești
Association football forwards
Romanian footballers
Romania international footballers
Romania under-21 international footballers
FC Argeș Pitești players
CS Mioveni players
FC Unirea Urziceni players
FC Steaua București players
Galatasaray S.K. footballers
Orduspor footballers
Gençlerbirliği S.K. footballers
Bursaspor footballers
Liga I players
Süper Lig players
Romanian expatriate footballers
Expatriate footballers in Turkey
Romanian expatriate sportspeople in Turkey
UEFA Euro 2016 players